John Selby Spence (February 29, 1788October 24, 1840) was an American politician.

Born near Snow Hill, Maryland, Spence attended the common schools and graduated from the medical department of the University of Pennsylvania at Philadelphia in 1809 and practiced in Worcester County, Maryland.  Spence served as a member of both the Maryland House of Delegates and as a member of the Maryland State Senate.  In 1822, Spence was elected to the Eighteenth Congress, and served from March 4, 1823, to March 3, 1825.  He was again elected as an Anti-Jacksonian in 1830 to the Twenty-second Congress, and served from March 4, 1831, to March 3, 1833.

In 1836, Spence was elected as an Anti-Jacksonian (later Whig) to the United States Senate to fill the vacancy caused by the death of Robert H. Goldsborough.  He was reelected in 1837, and served from December 31, 1836, until his death near Berlin, Maryland, in 1840.  He is interred in the Episcopal Churchyard.

See also
List of United States Congress members who died in office (1790–1899)

References

External links
 

1788 births
1840 deaths
Maryland state senators
Members of the Maryland House of Delegates
United States senators from Maryland
People from Snow Hill, Maryland
Maryland National Republicans
Maryland Whigs
National Republican Party United States senators
Whig Party United States senators
Democratic-Republican Party members of the United States House of Representatives from Maryland
19th-century American politicians